Nishtar may refer to:

 Abdur Rab Nishtar (1899–1958), Pakistani politician
 Sania Nishtar (born 1963), Pakistani politician

See also
 Nishtar Park, in Karachi, Sindh, Pakistan
 Nishtar Park bombing